Svenska Supercupen 2009, Swedish Super Cup 2009, was a Swedish football match, played 21 March 2009 between Allsvenskan champions Kalmar FF and Svenska Cupen winners IFK Göteborg. The match was played at Fredriksskans in Kalmar.

Daniel Mendes scored a late goal in the 89th minute, winning the match for Kalmar FF.

This was the 3rd edition of Svenska Supercupen, the first was in 2007 when IF Elfsborg beat Helsingborgs IF 1-0.

Match facts

Supercupen
2009 Svenska Supercupen
Kalmar FF matches
IFK Göteborg matches